Lee Willie Tate (born March 18, 1932) is an American former professional baseball player.

Tate played in 51 games for the Cardinals: ten (eight as a starting shortstop) at the end of the 1958 season, and 41 during the first three months of the 1959 campaign.  He started 12 games in relief of regular shortstop Alex Grammas between May 23 and June 6, 1959, and collected half of his 14 Major League hits over that time, including his only Major League home run, off Johnny Antonelli of the San Francisco Giants on May 27.  Overall, he batted .165 (14 for 85) in the Major Leagues, with three doubles and one triple his other extra-base hits.

As a minor leaguer, he appeared in over 1,600 games.

References

External links

1932 births
Living people
Austin Braves players
Baseball players from Arkansas
Bradford Phillies players
Dallas Eagles players
Denver Bears players
Elizabethton Phils players
Louisville Colonels (minor league) players
Major League Baseball shortstops
Minneapolis Millers (baseball) players
Nashville Vols players
Oklahoma City 89ers players
Omaha Cardinals players
People from Lawrence County, Arkansas
Richmond Virginians (minor league) players
Rochester Red Wings players
St. Louis Cardinals players
Salina Blue Jays players
Salt Lake City Bees players
Toronto Maple Leafs (International League) players